Tirukozhambiam Kokileswarar Temple  (திருக்கோழம்பியம் கோகிலேஸ்வரர் கோயில்) is a Hindu temple located at Thanjavur district of Tamil Nadu, India. The presiding deity is Shiva. He is called as Kokileswarar.  His consort is Soundara Nayaki.

Significance 
It is one of the 275 Paadal Petra Sthalams - Shiva Sthalams glorified in the early medieval Tevaram poems by Tamil Saivite Nayanar saints Tirunavukkarasar and Thirugnana Sambandar.

Legend 
According to Hindu legend, a person named Chandan was reborn as a nightingale (kokila) due to the curse of Indra. He meditated upon Shiva and reassumed his original form here. As per another legend, when a cow passed through the place, its feet trampled on a Sivalinga, which became this place.

Features 
The main idol is a shivalinga. There are the footprints of a cow upon the shivalinga. The temple is under the administration of the Thiruvaduthurai Adheenam. The temple is counted as one of the temples built on the banks of River Kaveri.

References

External links

Gallery 

Shiva temples in Thanjavur district
Padal Petra Stalam